Gholam Mohammad Maimangi (1873 –1935), was a prominent Afghan painter.

Life 
Maimangi was the founder of School of Fine Arts in Kabul. He is considered one of the painters of the second golden age of Realism in Afghanistan, along with Karim Shah Khan, Abdul Ghafoor Breshna, Ghulam Mohieddin Shabnam, Hafiz Pakzad and Akbar Khorasani.

References 

Afghan painters
1873 births
1935 deaths